The grey-winged Inca finch (Incaspiza ortizi) is a species of bird traditionally placed in the family Emberizidae, but it may be more closely related to the Thraupidae.

It is endemic to Peru. Its natural habitat is subtropical or tropical high-altitude shrubland.
It is threatened by habitat loss.

References

External links
BirdLife International species factsheet

grey-winged Inca finch
Birds of the Peruvian Andes
Endemic birds of Peru
grey-winged Inca finch
grey-winged Inca finch
Taxonomy articles created by Polbot